Zhongdu (lit. "Central Capital") was the capital of the Jurchen-led Jin dynasty in medieval China. It was located in the southwestern part of Beijing's Xicheng District. It had a population of nearly one million by the late 12th century, and was the last and largest city built on that location before the Yuan dynasty.

The Daning Palace and Taiye Lake were located to the city's northeast.

After a move to Kaifeng was mooted by the Jin dynasty following a visit by Genghis Khan in 1214, he returned to the city the next year and destroyed it. His grandson Kublai Khan did not rebuild the site but instead built his capital of Khanbaliq to its northeast around the Daning Palace park.

See also
 History of Beijing
 Nanjing (Liao dynasty)
 Khanbaliq

References 

Ancient Chinese capitals
History of Beijing
Jin dynasty (1115–1234)